Matin is a surname. Notable people with the surname include:

Abdul Karim Matin, Pashtun politician
Abdul Matin (actor) (born 1980), Nepali actor
Abdul Matin (language activist) (born 1926), Bangladeshi language activist
Abdul Matin (poet), Indian poet
Abdul Matin (politician), Bangladeshi politician
Abdul Matin (Taliban leader), Afghan Taliban leader
Ahmad Matin-Daftari (1897–1971), Iranian Prime Minister
M. A. Matin (officer), Bangladeshi army officer
M.A. Matin (politician) (died 2012), Bangladeshi politician